The Jantzen Knitting Mills Company Building is a building located in northeast Portland, Oregon, USA, listed on the National Register of Historic Places. The picture is of the corner of 19th Ave. and NE Glisan St.

See also
 National Register of Historic Places listings in Northeast Portland, Oregon
Jantzen

References

External links
 

1929 establishments in Oregon
Art Deco architecture in Oregon
Industrial buildings and structures on the National Register of Historic Places in Portland, Oregon
Industrial buildings completed in 1929
Northeast Portland, Oregon
Kerns, Portland, Oregon
Portland Historic Landmarks